This is a discography for the gospel vocal group Gaither Vocal Band.

Albums

Compilations
Some contain additional new material or alternate versions of the original albums.

1989: The Best from the Beginning (Word)
1994: The King is Coming (Benson)
1995: Can't Stop Talkin' About Him (Star Song)
1999: Classic Moments from the Gaither Vocal Band – Volume 1 (Benson)
1999: Classic Moments from the Gaither Vocal Band – Volume 2 (Benson)
2003: 8 Great Hits (Sparrow)
2004: The Best of the Gaither Vocal Band (Gaither Music Group)
2013: Icon (Spring House/Universal Music)
2015: Christmas Collection (Gaither Music Group)
2016: The Ultimate Playlist (Gaither Music Group) – available online only

Appearances on other albums
1998: The Apostle original soundtrack: "There Is a River"
1998: Faithful, The Cathedrals: "Heaven's Joy Awaits"
2000: 50 Years, The Happy Goodmans: "Bein' Happy", "Give Up"
2001: Greatest Moments with the Christ Church Choir, "When Jesus Lifts The Load”
2001: Encore, Old Friends Quartet:  "Unbelievable Friend", "A Few Good Men"
2001: On Broadway, Mark Lowry:  "Bein' Happy", "Let Freedom Ring", "Mary, Did You Know?"
2005: Ernie Haase & Signature Sound, Ernie Haase & Signature Sound: "Where No One Stands Alone, "Oh! What A Time"
2007: Get Away, Jordan, Ernie Haase & Signature Sound: "Search Me Lord", "Home", "He Touched Me"
2007: Don't Let Me Miss The Glory, Gordon Mote: "Get Up In Jesus' Name"
2009: Pilgrimage, Larry Gatlin and The Gatlin Brothers:  "He Brought Her Back"
2009: Jason Crabb, Jason Crabb: "Daystar"
2011: The Song Lives On, Jason Crabb: "Satisfied", "Satisfied (Hallelujah)", "Please Forgive Me"
2011: Brighter One, Marshall Hall: "I Just Feel Like Something Good Is About To Happen", ":30"
2012: Classic, David Phelps:  "The Dream", "Swing Down Chariot", "Glorious Impossible", "You Are My All In All"
2013: All Things New, Gordon Mote: "Down To The River"
2015: Songs In The Key Of Happy, Goodman Revival: "Search Me, Lord", "Sometimes It Takes A Mountain"
2015: Freedom, David Phelps:  "When We All Get Together With The Lord", "Your Time Will Come"
2016: Circuit Rider, Mark Lowry: "Against The Grain"
2017: "What's Not To Love?", Mark Lowry: "What's Not To Love"

Video

Homecoming video performances
1989: A Praise Gathering: "He Came Down To My Level", "Alpha and Omega", "It Took A Faith", "He Touched Me", "Daystar (Shine Down On Me)", "Joy In The Morning", "Over The Moon", "Dream On"
1993: Old Friends: "The Old Gospel Ship"
1994: Landmark: "The Old Landmark"
1994: Precious Memories: "Had It Not Been"
1995: When All Of God's Singers Get Home: "I Shall Wear A Crown"
1995: Sunday Meetin' Time: "Home Where I Belong"
1996: Ryman Gospel Reunion: "You And Me Jesus", "When Jesus Says It's Enough"
1996: Sing Your Blues Away: "The Old Gospel Ship"
1996: Homecoming Texas Style: "Yes, I Know"
1996: Joy To The World: "New Star Shining"
1996: Moments to Remember: "I'm Gonna Keep On"
1997: Feelin' at Home: "Yes, I Know"
1998: Singin’ With The Saints: "Singing With The Saints" "I Know Where I Am Now"
1998: Rivers Of Joy: "Loving God, Loving Each Other"
1998: Down By Tabernacle: "Tell Me", "The Baptism Of Jesse Taylor"
1998: All Day Singin' At The Dome: "Satisfied", "I Believe In A Hill Called Mt. Calvary"
1998: Atlanta Homecoming: "Where Could I Go", "Alpha And Omega"
1999: Kennedy Center Homecoming: "Promises One By One", "The Star-Spangled Banner"
1999: So Glad!: "Bein' Happy"
1999: I'll Meet You On The Mountain: "There Is A Mountain"
2000: Good News: "Good, Good News"
2000: Harmony in the Heartland: "A House Of Gold"
2000: Memphis Homecoming: "God Is Good All The Time", "Build An Ark"
2000: Oh, My Glory!: "I Shall Wear A Crown", "Let Freedom Ring"
2000: Irish Homecoming: "Whenever We Agree Together", "Satisfied (Hallelujah)", "It Is Finished"
2000: Whispering Hope: "Singing With The Saints", "Child, You're Forgiven"
2000: Christmas in the Country: "Mary Was The First One To Carry The Gospel"
2000: Christmas... A Time for Joy: "The Christmas Song", "Mary, Did You Know?", "The King is Coming"
2001: London Homecoming: "He Came Down To My Level", "The Old Rugged Cross Made The Difference"
2001: A Billy Graham Music Homecoming – Vol. 1: "The King Is Coming", "In That Great Gettin' Up Morning"
2001: A Billy Graham Music Homecoming – Vol. 2: "Because He Lives", "He Touched Me"
2001: Journey To The Sky: "The Love Of God"
2001: Passin' The Faith Along: "Passin' The Faith Along", "Born Again"
2001: Freedom Band: "Loving God, Loving Each Other"
2001: Hymns: "Satisfied (Hallelujah)"
2002: New Orleans Homecoming: "On The Authority"
2002: God Bless America: "I'm Gonna Sing"
2002: Let Freedom Ring: "When We All Get Together With The Lord", "The Pledge Of Allegiance", "Let Freedom Ring"
2003: Going Home:"Knowing You'll Be There"
2003: Red Rocks Homecoming: "Ridin' Down The Canyon", "It Is Finished"
2003: Rocky Mountain Homecoming: "That's When The Angels Rejoice", "America the Beautiful", "These Are They"
2003: A Gospel Bluegrass Homecoming Vol. 1: "Yes, I Know"
2003: A Gospel Bluegrass Homecoming Vol. 2: "Knowing You'll Be There
2004: Build A Bridge: "Let Freedom Ring"
2005: Israel Homecoming: "Second Fiddle", "Holy Highway"
2005: Jerusalem Homecoming: "Can't Stop Talkin' About Him", "These Are They"
2006: Canadian Homecoming: "My Journey To The Sky", "Holy Highway", "Alpha And Omega"
2006: Live From Toronto: "Bread Upon The Water", "I'll Tell It Wherever I Go", "Why Me", "I Bowed On My Knees"
2006: Christmas In South Africa: "Jesus Loves Me", "Reaching", "Singing With The Saints"
2006: Homecoming Christmas: "Give It Away", "The Glorious Impossible", "The King Is Coming"
2007: Love Can Turn The World: "Love Can Turn The World", "There Is A River"
2007: South African Homecoming: "My Lord And I", "Little Is Much When God Is In It", "Worthy The Lamb"
2007: Amazing Grace: "I Then Shall Live"
2008: A Campfire Homecoming: "Can't Stop Talkin' About Him", "Yes, I Know"
2008: Homecoming Picnic: "I Heard It First On The Radio"
2008: Country Bluegrass Homecoming Vol. 1: "Child Forgiven"
2008: Country Bluegrass Homecoming Vol. 2: "Jesus And John Wayne"
2009: Joy In My Heart: "Bread Upon The Water"
2010: Count Your Blessings: "Greatly Blessed, Highly Favored", "He Is Here"
2010: Giving Thanks: "You Are My All In All"
2011: Alaskan Homecoming: "Better Day", "Clean", "These Are They"
2011: Majesty: "My Lord And I", "Satisfied (Hallelujah)"
2011: Tent Revival Homecoming: "Jesus Hold My Hand", "He's Alive"
2011: The Old Rugged Cross: "Greatly Blessed, Highly Favored", "That Sounds Like Home To Me"
2012: Gaither Homecoming Celebration! (taped in 1998): "Singing With The Saints", "Bein' Happy", "Faith Unlocks The Door/God Takes Good Care Of Me/Climbing Higher And Higher/Then I Met The Master (Medley)", "Loving God, Loving Each Other", "The King Is Coming"
2017: Give The World A Smile: "Working On A Building"
2017: Sweeter As The Days Go By: "You've Got A Friend", We'll Talk It Over"

References

Discographies of American artists
Christian music discographies